The Republican Socialist Collective was a fringe Irish republican political group in Northern Ireland formed in 1986. The RSC formed the political arm of the Irish People's Liberation Organisation, a splinter group of the Irish National Liberation Army, under the leadership of Jimmy Brown. Ideologically the group endorsed a militant brand of revolutionary socialism.

Although the party did not take part in any elections it did organise a number of public meetings and debates in Belfast and Newry. It was disestablished in 1992 when the Provisional IRA eliminated the IPLO whilst Brown was killed by a rival faction within the IPLO.

The group also published a quarterly newspaper called the Socialist Republican.

References

Political parties established in 1986
Political parties disestablished in 1992
1992 disestablishments in Northern Ireland
1986 establishments in Northern Ireland
Defunct political parties in Northern Ireland
Irish republican parties
Irish People's Liberation Organisation
Socialist parties in Ireland